Norman Gary Finkelstein (born December 8, 1953) is an American political scientist, activist, former professor, and author. His primary fields of research are the Israeli–Palestinian conflict and the politics of the Holocaust. He is a graduate of Binghamton University and received his Ph.D. in political science at Princeton University. He has held faculty positions at Brooklyn College, Rutgers University, Hunter College, New York University, and DePaul University, where he was an assistant professor from 2001 to 2007.

In 2007, after a highly publicized feud between Finkelstein and Alan Dershowitz, an academic opponent, Finkelstein was denied tenure at DePaul. He was placed on administrative leave for the 2007–08 academic year, and on September 5, 2007, he announced his resignation after coming to a settlement with the university on largely undisclosed terms. In an official statement, Finkelstein said that as he had more than fulfilled the requirements for tenure, and the department and college-level committees had voted to tenure him, he concluded that the decision not to give tenure was due to external pressures that had affected the process; in the same statement, DePaul defended the decision to deny Finkelstein tenure and said that outside influence played no role in the decision, and described Finkelstein as "a prolific scholar and outstanding teacher." In 2008, he was denied entry to Israel and banned from entering the country for ten years.

Biography

Family 
Norman Finkelstein was born on December 8, 1953, in New York City, the son of Harry and Maryla (née Husyt) Finkelstein. Finkelstein's parents were Jewish. His mother grew up in Warsaw and survived the Warsaw Ghetto and the Majdanek concentration camp. His father was a survivor of both the Warsaw Ghetto and Auschwitz.

After the war they met in a displaced persons camp in Linz, Austria, and then emigrated to the United States, where his father became a factory worker and his mother a homemaker and later a bookkeeper. Finkelstein's mother was an ardent pacifist. Both his parents died in 1995. 

Finkelstein has said of his parents that "they saw the world through the prism of the Nazi Holocaust. They were eternally indebted to the Soviet Union (to whom they attributed the defeat of the Nazis), and so anyone who was anti-Soviet they were extremely harsh on". They supported the Soviet Union's approval of the creation of the State of Israel, as enunciated by Andrei Andreyevich Gromyko, who said that Jews had earned the right to a state, but thought that Israel had sold its soul to the West and "refused to have any truck with it".

Early life and education 

Finkelstein grew up in Borough Park, then Mill Basin, both in Brooklyn, New York, where he attended James Madison High School. In his memoir he recalls strongly identifying with the outrage that his mother, who witnessed the genocidal atrocities of World War II, felt at the carnage the United States wrought in Vietnam. One childhood friend recalls his mother's "emotional investment in left-wing humanitarian causes as bordering on hysteria". He "internalized [her] indignation", a trait that he admits rendered him "insufferable" when talking about the Vietnam War, and that imbued him with a "holier-than-thou" attitude he now regrets. But Finkelstein regards his absorption of his mother's outlook—the refusal to put aside a sense of moral outrage in order to get on with one's life—as a virtue. Subsequently, reading Noam Chomsky played a role in learning to apply the moral passions his mother bequeathed to him with intellectual rigor.

Finkelstein completed his undergraduate studies at Binghamton University in New York in 1974, after which he studied at the École Pratique des Hautes Études in 1979 in Paris. He was an ardent Maoist from his teenage years on and was "totally devastated" by the news of the trial of the Gang of Four in 1976, which led him to decide he had been misled. He was, he says, bedridden for three weeks.

He received his Master's degree in political science in 1980, and his PhD in political studies from Princeton in 1988. He is a member of Phi Beta Kappa. His doctoral thesis was on Zionism. Before gaining academic employment, Finkelstein was a part-time social worker with teenage dropouts in New York.

According to Finkelstein, his involvement in the Israel-Palestinian conflict began in 1982 when he and a handful of other Jews in New York protested against the Israeli invasion of Lebanon. He held a sign saying: "This son of survivors of the Warsaw Ghetto Uprising, Auschwitz, Maijdenek will not be silent: Israeli Nazis – Stop the Holocaust in Lebanon!"

During the First Intifada, he spent every summer from 1988 in the West Bank as a guest of Palestinian families in Hebron and Beit Sahour, where he taught English at a local school. Finkelstein wrote that the fact that he was Jewish didn't bother most Palestinians: "The typical response was indifference. Word had been passed to the shebab that I was 'okay' and, generally, the matter rested there." He would recount his experiences of the intifada in his 1996 book The Rise and Fall of Palestine.

Professorship 
Finkelstein first taught at Rutgers University as an adjunct lecturer in international relations (1977–78), then at Brooklyn College (1988–1991), Hunter College (1992–2001), New York University (1992–2001), and DePaul University (2001–2007). The New York Times reported that Finkelstein left Hunter College in 2001 "after his teaching load and salary were reduced" by the college administration. He has said he enjoyed teaching at Hunter and was "unceremoniously kicked out" after begging it to keep him on with just two courses a semester for $12,000 a year. Hunter set conditions that would have required him to spend four days a week teaching, which he thought unacceptable. Finkelstein taught at Sakarya University Middle East Institute in Turkey in 2014–15.

Academic career
Beginning with his doctoral thesis at Princeton, Finkelstein's writings have been controversial. He has described himself as a "forensic" scholar who has worked to demystify what he considers pseudo-scholarly arguments. He has written scathing academic reviews of several prominent writers and scholars he accuses of misrepresenting facts in order to defend Israel's policies and practices. His writings have dealt with politically charged topics such as Zionism, the demographic history of Palestine and his allegations of the existence of a "Holocaust industry" that exploits the memory of the Holocaust to further Israeli and financial interests. He has also described himself as "an old-fashioned communist", in the sense that he "see[s] no value whatsoever in states."

Finkelstein's work has been praised by scholars such as Raul Hilberg, Avi Shlaim, and Noam Chomsky, and his advocates and detractors have remarked on his polemical style.

On From Time Immemorial
Finkelstein's doctoral thesis examined the claims made in Joan Peters's From Time Immemorial, a best-selling book at the time. Peters's "history and defense" of Israel deals with the demographic history of Palestine. Demographic studies had tended to assert that the Arab population of Ottoman-controlled Palestine, a 94% majority at the turn of the century, had dwindled toward parity due to massive Zionist immigration. Peters radically challenged this view by arguing that a substantial portion of the Palestinians were descended from immigrants from other Arab countries from the early 19th century onward. It followed, for Peters and many of her readers, that the picture of a native Palestinian population overwhelmed by Jewish immigration was little more than propaganda, and that in actuality two almost simultaneous waves of immigration met in what had been a relatively unpopulated land.

From Time Immemorial was praised by figures as varied as Barbara Tuchman, Theodore H. White, Elie Wiesel, and Lucy Dawidowicz. Saul Bellow wrote in a jacket endorsement, "Millions of people the world over, smothered by false history and propaganda, will be grateful for this clear account of the origins of the Palestinians."

Finkelstein called the book a "monumental hoax". He later opined that, while Peters's book received widespread interest and approval in the United States, a scholarly demonstration of its fraudulence and unreliability aroused little attention:

By the end of 1984, From Time Immemorial had...received some two hundred [favorable] notices ... in the United States. The only "false" notes in this crescendoing chorus of praise were the Journal of Palestine Studies, which ran a highly critical review by Bill Farrell; the small Chicago-based newsweekly In These Times, which published a condensed version of this writer's findings; and Alexander Cockburn, who devoted a series of columns in The Nation exposing the hoax. ... The periodicals in which From Time Immemorial had already been favorably reviewed refused to run any critical correspondence (e.g., The New Republic, The Atlantic Monthly, Commentary). Periodicals that had yet to review the book rejected a manuscript on the subject as of little or no consequence (e.g., The Village Voice, Dissent, The New York Review of Books). Not a single national newspaper or columnist contacted found it newsworthy that a best-selling, effusively praised "study" of the Middle East conflict was a threadbare hoax.

In Understanding Power, Chomsky wrote that Finkelstein sent his preliminary findings to about 30 people interested in the topic, but no one replied, except for him, and that was how they became friends:
I told him, yeah, I think it’s an interesting topic, but I warned him, if you follow this, you’re going to get in trouble—because you're going to expose the American intellectual community as a gang of frauds, and they are not going to like it, and they're going to destroy you. So I said: if you want to do it, go ahead, but be aware of what you're getting into. It's an important issue, it makes a big difference whether you eliminate the moral basis for driving out a population—it's preparing the basis for some real horrors—so a lot of people's lives could be at stake. But your life is at stake too, I told him, because if you pursue this, your career is going to be ruined. Well, he didn't believe me. We became very close friends after this, I didn't know him before.

According to Chomsky, the controversy surrounding Finkelstein's research caused a delay in his earning his Ph.D. at Princeton University. Chomsky wrote that Finkelstein "literally could not get the faculty to read [his dissertation]" and that Princeton eventually granted Finkelstein his doctorate only "out of embarrassment [for Princeton]" but refused to give him any further professional backing.

In a 1996 Foreign Affairs review, William B. Quandt called Finkelstein's critique of From Time Immemorial a "landmark essay" that helped demonstrate Peters's "shoddy scholarship". Israeli historian Avi Shlaim later praised Finkelstein's thesis, saying that it had established his credentials when he was still a doctoral student. In Shlaim's view, Finkelstein had produced an "unanswerable case" with "irrefutable evidence" that Peters's book was "preposterous and worthless".

The Rise and Fall of Palestine 
In 1996 Finkelstein published The Rise and Fall of Palestine: A Personal Account of the Intifada Years, which chronicled his visits to the West Bank during the First Intifada. Through personal accounts, he compares the plight of the Palestinians living under occupation with the horrors of the Nazis.

The book was unfavorably reviewed by Joost Hiltermann, who objected to Finkelstein's "abrasiveness, righteous anger, hyperbole, distortions and unwarranted generalizations", and to his generalizations about West Bank Palestinians:

Hiltermann wrote that while "there is plenty of reason to be anguished about the terrible injustice inflicted upon the Palestinian", Finkelstein's "bludgeoning" style wouldn't reach an audience beyond those already converted.

The Holocaust Industry

The Holocaust Industry: Reflections on the Exploitation of Jewish Suffering was published in 2000. In this work, Finkelstein argues that Elie Wiesel and others exploit the memory of the Holocaust as an "ideological weapon". Their purpose, he writes, is to enable Israel, "one of the world's most formidable military powers, with a horrendous human rights record, [to] cast itself as a victim state"; that is, to provide Israel "immunity to criticism". He alleges "a repellent gang of plutocrats, hoodlums and hucksters" have sought enormous legal damages and financial settlements from Germany and Switzerland, money that then goes to the lawyers and institutional actors involved in procuring them rather than actual Holocaust survivors. In a television interview to publicize the book, he said a "handful of American Jews have effectively hijacked the Nazi Holocaust to blackmail Europe" to "divert attention from what is being done to the Palestinians".

The book was received negatively in many quarters, with critics charging that it was poorly researched and/or allowed others to exploit it for antisemitic purposes. The German historian Hans Mommsen disparaged the first edition as "a most trivial book, which appeals to easily aroused anti-Semitic prejudices". Israeli Holocaust historian Israel Gutman called it "a lampoon, which takes a serious subject and distorts it for improper purposes. I don't even think it should be reviewed or critiqued as a legitimate book." The Holocaust Industry was also harshly criticized by Brown University Professor Omer Bartov, University of Chicago Professor Peter Novick and other reviewers accusing Finkelstein of selective or dubious evidence and misinterpretation of history. At the time the book was published in Germany, Der Spiegel reported the country was "in the grip of Holocaust madness. Finkelstein is being taken seriously. What he says corresponds with what many who do not know the facts think." In an interview, Finkelstein said, "the Holocaust is a political weapon. Germans have legitimate reasons to defend themselves against this abuse".

In an August 2000 interview for Swiss National Radio, Holocaust historian Raul Hilberg said the book expressed views Hilberg held, in that he too found "detestable" the exploitation of the Holocaust by groups such as the World Jewish Congress. Asked whether Finkelstein's analysis might play into the hands of neo-Nazis for antisemitic purposes, Hilberg replied, "Well, even if they do use it in that fashion, I'm afraid that when it comes to the truth, it has to be said openly, without regard to any consequences that would be undesirable, embarrassing".

In a review in the journal Historical Materialism, Enzo Traverso called the book "polemical and violent" but also "in many ways appropriate and convincing". Traverso expressed many reservations about Finkelstein's arguments about the Swiss banks and the reaction in Europe. Traverso agreed (with Hilberg) that the allegations Finkelstein made against a number of Jewish-American institutions are probably correct. He also referred to the favorable reception Finkelstein's book received in the Frankfurter Allgemeine Zeitung, calling it "welcome hyberbole". But Traverso criticized Finkelstein for ignoring the European aspect of the matter, and said Finkelstein's analysis was too simplistic and crudely materialistic. He concluded, "Finkelstein's book contains a core of truth that must be recognised, but it lends itself, due to its style and several of its main arguments, to the worst uses and instrumentalisations".

The historian David Cesarani criticized Finkelstein for absolving Swiss banks of serious misconduct toward Holocaust survivors and depicting the banks as victims of Jewish terror based on a sentence from an important report annex. "To support this amazing argument he quotes a statement from the authoritative Report of the Independent Committee of Eminent Persons that 'there was no evidence of systematic discrimination, obstruction of access, misappropriation, or violation of document retention requirements of Swiss law'. Indeed, but these words come from an annex", Cesarani wrote.

Criticism of Alan Dershowitz's The Case for Israel

Shortly after the publication of Alan Dershowitz's book The Case for Israel, Finkelstein derided it as "a collection of fraud, falsification, plagiarism, and nonsense". During a debate on Democracy Now!, Finkelstein asserted that Dershowitz lacked knowledge of specific contents of his own book. He also claimed that Dershowitz did not write the book and may not have even read it.

Finkelstein said there were 20 instances, in as many pages, where Dershowitz's book cites the same sources and passages Peters used in her book, in largely the same sequence, with ellipses in the same places. In two instances, Dershowitz reproduces Peters's errors (see below). From this Finkelstein concluded that Dershowitz had not checked the original sources himself, contrary to his claims. Finkelstein suggests that this copying of quotations amounts to copying ideas. Examining a copy of a proof of Dershowitz's book he managed to obtain, he found evidence that Dershowitz had his secretarial assistant, Holly Beth Billington, check in the Harvard library the sources he had read in Peters's book. Dershowitz answered the charge in a letter to the University of California's Press Director Lynne Withey, arguing that Finkelstein had made up the smoking gun quotation by changing its wording (from "cite" to "copy") in his book. In public debate, he has said that if "somebody borrowed the quote without going to check back on whether Mark Twain had said that, obviously that would be a serious charge", but insisted emphatically that he did not do that but had indeed checked the original source.

Dershowitz threatened libel action over the charges in Finkelstein's book, as a consequence of which the publisher deleted the word "plagiarism" from the text before publication. Finkelstein agreed to remove the suggestion that Dershowitz was not the true author of The Case for Israel because, as the publisher said, "he couldn't document that".

Asserting that he did consult the original sources, Dershowitz said Finkelstein was simply accusing him of good scholarly practice: citing references he learned of initially from Peters's book. Dershowitz denied that he used any of Peters's ideas without citation. "Plagiarism is taking someone else's words and claiming they're your own. There are no borrowed words from anybody. There are no borrowed ideas from anybody because I fundamentally disagree with the conclusions of Peters's book." In a footnote in The Case for Israel that cites Peters's book, Dershowitz explicitly denies that he "relies" on Peters for "conclusions or data".

In their joint interview on Democracy Now, Finkelstein cited specific passages in Dershowitz's book in which a phrase that he said Peters coined was incorrectly attributed to George Orwell:

[Peters] coins the phrase "turnspeak"; she says she's using it as a play off of George Orwell, which as all listeners know used the phrase "Newspeak." She coined her own phrase, "turnspeak". You go to Mr. Dershowitz's book, he got so confused in his massive borrowings from Joan Peters that on two occasions—I'll cite them for those who have a copy of the book, on page 57 and on page 153—he uses the phrase "George Orwell's 'turnspeak'." "Turnspeak" is not Orwell, Mr. Dershowitz".

James O. Freedman, the former president of Dartmouth College, the University of Iowa, and the American Academy of Arts and Sciences, defended Dershowitz:

I do not understand [Finkelstein's] charge of plagiarism against Alan Dershowitz. There is no claim that Dershowitz used the words of others without attribution. When he uses the words of others, he quotes them properly and generally cites them to the original sources (Mark Twain, Palestine Royal Commission, etc.) [Finkelstein's] complaint is that instead he should have cited them to the secondary source, in which Dershowitz may have come upon them. But as The Chicago Manual of Style emphasizes: 'Importance of attribution. With all reuse of others' materials, it is important to identify the original as the source. This not only bolsters the claims of fair use, it also helps avoid any accusation of plagiarism.' This is precisely what Dershowitz did.

Responding to an article in The Nation by Alexander Cockburn, Dershowitz also cited The Chicago Manual of Style:

Cockburn's claim is that some of the quotes should not have been cited to their original sources but rather to a secondary source, where he believes I stumbled upon them. Even if he were correct that I found all these quotations in Peters's book, the preferred method of citation is to the original source, as The Chicago Manual of Style emphasizes: "With all reuse of others' materials, it is important to identify the original as the source. This...helps avoid any accusation of plagiarism ... To cite a source from a secondary source ('quoted in...') is generally to be discouraged"

Cockburn responded:

Quoting The Chicago Manual of Style, Dershowitz artfully implies that he followed the rules by citing "the original" as opposed to the secondary source, Peters. He misrepresents Chicago here, where "the original" means merely the origin of the borrowed material, which is, in this instance, Peters.

Now look at the second bit of the quote from Chicago, chastely separated from the preceding sentence by a demure three-point ellipsis. As my associate Kate Levin has discovered, this passage ("To cite a source from a secondary source...") occurs on page 727, which is no less than 590 pages later than the material before the ellipsis, in a section titled "Citations Taken from Secondary Sources." Here's the full quote, with what Dershowitz left out set in bold: "'Quoted in'. To cite a source from a secondary source ("quoted in") is generally to be discouraged, since authors are expected to have examined the works they cite. If an original source is unavailable, however, both the original and the secondary source must be listed."

So Chicago is clearly insisting that unless Dershowitz went to the originals, he was obliged to cite Peters. Finkelstein has conclusively demonstrated that he didn't go to the originals. Plagiarism, QED, plus added time for willful distortion of the language of Chicago's guidelines, cobbling together two separate discussions.

On Dershowitz's behalf, Harvard Law School dean Elena Kagan asked former Harvard president Derek Bok to investigate the assertion of plagiarism; Bok exonerated Dershowitz of the charge.

In April 2007, Frank Menetrez, a former Editor-in-Chief of the UCLA Law Review, published an analysis of the charges Dershowitz made against Finkelstein and concluded that Dershowitz had misrepresented matters. In a follow-up analysis he concluded that he could find "no way of avoiding the inference that Dershowitz copied the quotation from Twain from Peters's From Time Immemorial, and not from the original source", as Dershowitz claimed.

Controversies

Tenure rejection and resignation

Amid considerable public debate, Dershowitz campaigned to block Finkelstein's tenure bid at DePaul University. His campaign began in 2004 when he sent DePaul president Dennis Holtschneider a manuscript, "Literary McCarthyism," arguing that the university should fire Finkelstein. He also contacted DePaul political science department chair Patrick Callahan. In 2005, Dershowitz announced his intent to block Finkelstein's tenure bid, saying, "I will come at my own expense, and I will document the case against Finkelstein" and "I'll demonstrate that he doesn't meet the academic standards of the Association of American Universities". In October 2006, he sent members of DePaul's law and political science faculties what he called "a dossier of Norman Finkelstein's most egregious academic sins, and especially his outright lies, misquotations, and distortions" and lobbied DePaul's professors, alumni and administrators to deny Finkelstein tenure. In May 2007, Dershowitz spoke at Northwestern University and claimed that Finkelstein had recently attended a Holocaust denial conference in Iran.

DePaul's political science committee investigated Dershowitz's accusations against Finkelstein and concluded that they were unsubstantiated. The department subsequently invited John Mearsheimer and Ian Lustick, two previously uninvolved academics with expertise on the Israel–Palestinian conflict, to evaluate the academic merit of Finkelstein's work; they came to the same conclusion.

In early 2007, DePaul's political science department voted nine to three, and the College of Liberal Arts and Sciences Personnel Committee five to zero, to give Finkelstein tenure. The three opposing faculty members subsequently filed a minority report opposing tenure, supported by the Dean of the College, Chuck Suchar. In leaked memos, Suchar wrote that he opposed tenure because "the personal attacks in many of Dr. Finkelstein's published books ... border on character assassination" and his attitudes threatened "some basic tenets of discourse within an academic community". He believed they were inconsistent with DePaul's "Vincentian" values. As examples, Suchar said that Finkelstein lacked respect for "the dignity of the individual" and for "the rights of others to hold and express different intellectual positions". In June 2007, DePaul University's Board on Promotion and Tenure, with the support of Holtschneider, denied Finkelstein tenure by a 4–3 vote.

The university denied that Dershowitz's lobbying played a part in its decision. At the same time, the university denied tenure to international studies assistant professor Mehrene Larudee, a strong supporter of Finkelstein and Jewish Voice for Peace member, despite unanimous support from her department, the Personnel Committee and the dean. Finkelstein said that he would engage in civil disobedience if attempts were made to bar him from teaching his students.

The Faculty Council later affirmed the professors' right to appeal, which a university lawyer said was not possible. Council President Anne Bartlett said she was "terribly concerned" correct procedure had not been followed. DePaul's faculty association considered taking no-confidence votes on administrators, including Holtschneider, because of the tenure denials.

In June 2007, after two weeks of protests, some DePaul students staged a sit-in and hunger strike in support of both professors. The Illinois Conference of the American Association of University Professors also sent Holtschneider a letter reading, "It is entirely illegitimate for a university to deny tenure to a professor out of fear that his published research ... might hurt a college's reputation" and that the association has "explicitly rejected collegiality as an appropriate criterion for evaluating faculty members".

In a statement issued upon Finkelstein's resignation in September 2007, DePaul called him "a prolific scholar and an outstanding teacher". Dershowitz found the compromise and statement objectionable, saying that DePaul had "traded truth for peace" and that the claim Finkelstein "is a scholar is simply false. He's a propagandist". In a 2014 interview, Matthew Abraham, author of Out of Bounds: Academic Freedom and the Question of Palestine, called Finkelstein's tenure case "one of the most significant academic freedom cases in the last fifty years" and said it demonstrated "the substantial pressure outside parties can place on a mid-tier religious institution when the perspectives advanced by a controversial scholar threaten dominant interests".

Denied entry to Israel in 2008

In May 2008, Finkelstein was denied entry to Israel, according to unnamed Shin Bet security officials, because "of suspicions involving hostile elements in Lebanon" and because he "did not give a full accounting to interrogators with regard to these suspicions." Finkelstein had visited south Lebanon and met with Lebanese families during the 2006 Lebanon War. He was banned from entering Israel for 10 years.

Finkelstein was questioned after his arrival at Ben Gurion Airport near Tel Aviv and detained for 24 hours in a holding cell. His Israeli attorney Michael Sfard said he was questioned for several hours. The following day, he was deported on a flight to Amsterdam, his point of origin. In an interview with Haaretz, Finkelstein said, "I did my best to provide absolutely candid and comprehensive answers to all the questions put to me. I am confident that I have nothing to hide... no suicide missions or secret rendezvous with terrorist organizations." He had been traveling to visit friends in the West Bank and said he had no interest in visiting Israel.

Reception
Many of Finkelstein's books critically examine other authors' books. Authors of books he has criticized include Dershowitz, Daniel Jonah Goldhagen, and Benny Morris. They have in turn accused Finkelstein of grossly misrepresenting their work and quoting their books selectively. In 2007, Morris said, "Finkelstein is a notorious distorter of facts and of my work, not a serious or honest historian."

Hilberg has praised Finkelstein's work: "That takes a great amount of courage. His place in the whole history of writing history is assured, and that those who in the end are proven right triumph, and he will be among those who will have triumphed, albeit, it so seems, at great cost." In a peer review for Beyond Chutzpah, Avi Shlaim said that Finkelstein "has a most impressive track record in exposing spurious American-Jewish scholarship on the Arab-Israeli conflict." He praised Finkelstein for "all the sterling qualities for which he has become famous: erudition, originality, spark, meticulous attention to detail, intellectual integrity, courage, and formidable forensic skills."

Sara Roy said that her shared experience with Finkelstein as a child of Holocaust survivors engaged in research on the Palestinian-Israeli conflict gave her a unique position to comment. According to Roy, Finkelstein's scholarship is "exceptional both for its brilliance and rigor. In the fields of Middle Eastern studies and political science his work is considered seminal and there is no doubt that both disciplines would be intellectually weaker without it. Norman's power and value, however, do not emanate only from his scholarship but from his character. His life's work, shaped largely but not entirely by his experience as a child of survivors, has been and continues to be informed by a profound concern with human dignity and the danger of dehumanization."

The Israeli newspaper Haaretz wrote, "[i]t is difficult to sympathize with Finkelstein's opinions and preferences, especially since he decided to support Hezbollah, meet with its fighters and visit the graves of some of its slain operatives." Still, it argued that he should not be banned from entering Israel, because "meetings with Hezbollah operatives do not in themselves constitute a security risk".

Criticism
Finkelstein has been heavily criticized for many aspects of his work and public commentary. Daniel Goldhagen, whose book Hitler's Willing Executioners Finkelstein criticized, claimed his scholarship has "everything to do with his burning political agenda". Peter Novick, Professor of History at the University of Chicago and a historian of the Holocaust whose work Finkelstein said inspired The Holocaust Industry, has strongly criticized his work, calling it "trash". Similarly, Dershowitz, whose book The Case for Israel and Finkelstein's response Beyond Chutzpah sparked an ongoing feud between the two, has claimed Finkelstein is complicit in a conspiracy against pro-Israel scholars: "The mode of attack is consistent. Chomsky selects the target and directs Finkelstein to probe the writings in minute detail and conclude that the writer didn't actually write the work, that it is plagiarized, that it is a hoax and a fraud". Dershowitz added that Finkelstein has leveled charges against many academics, calling at least 10 "distinguished Jews 'hucksters', 'hoaxters', 'thieves', 'extortionists', and worse." Although the feud between Finkelstein and Dershowitz received the most attention in the controversy, Finkelstein has maintained that "the real issue is Israel's human rights record."

Israeli historian Omer Bartov, writing for The New York Times Book Review, judged The Holocaust Industry to be marred by the same errors Finkelstein denounces in those who exploit the Holocaust for profit or politics:

It is filled with precisely the kind of shrill hyperbole that Finkelstein rightly deplores in much of the current media hype over the Holocaust; it is brimming with the same indifference to historical facts, inner contradictions, strident politics and dubious contextualizations; and it oozes with the same smug sense of moral and intellectual superiority... Like any conspiracy theory, it contains several grains of truth; and like any such theory, it is both irrational and insidious.

Finkelstein has accused journalist Jeffrey Goldberg of "torturing" or "being an accessory to torture of" Palestinian prisoners during his IDF service in the First Intifada, based on statements in Goldberg's book Prisoners. Finkelstein says Goldberg admits to personally sending prisoners to the zinzana, which he says has been repeatedly condemned as torture in human rights reports. Goldberg called the allegation "ridiculous" and said he had "never laid a hand on anybody." Goldberg said his "principal role" was "making sure prisoners had fresh fruit." He called Finkelstein a "ridiculous figure" and accused him of "lying and purposely misreading my book."

American Radical: The Trials of Norman Finkelstein 
American Radical: The Trials of Norman Finkelstein is a documentary film about Finkelstein's life and career, released in 2009, and directed by David Ridgen and Nicolas Rossier. It has been screened at Amsterdam's IDFA, Toronto's Hot Docs, and many other venues. It has a freshness rating of 100% on film review aggregator Rotten Tomatoes. In one scene, at Waterloo University, Finkelstein takes exception to a German student's teary complaint about how he talks about the Nazis and the Holocaust, saying:

 

The same year, Finkelstein also appeared in Defamation (Hebrew: השמצה), a documentary by Israeli filmmaker Yoav Shamir.

Views on the Israel-Palestinian conflict

Comments about Israel

Finkelstein is a sharp critic of the state of Israel. Discussing his book Beyond Chutzpah, Israeli historian Avi Shlaim called Finkelstein's critique of Israel "extremely detailed, well-documented and accurate."

In a 2009 telephone interview with Today's Zaman, Finkelstein said:

I think Israel, as a number of commentators pointed out, is becoming an insane state. And we have to be honest about that. While the rest of the world wants peace, Europe wants peace, the US wants peace, but this state wants war, war and war. In the first week of the massacres, there were reports in the Israeli press that Israel did not want to put all its ground forces in Gaza because it was preparing attacks on Iran. Then there were reports it was planning attacks on Lebanon. It is a lunatic state.

When asked how he, as the son of Holocaust survivors, felt about Israel's operation in Gaza, Finkelstein replied:

It has been a long time since I felt any emotional connection with the state of Israel, which relentlessly and brutally and inhumanly keeps these vicious, murderous wars. It is a vandal state. There is a Russian writer who once described vandal states as Genghis Khan with a telegraph. Israel is Genghis Khan with a computer. I feel no emotion of affinity with that state. I have some good friends and their families there, and of course I would not want any of them to be hurt. That said, sometimes I feel that Israel has come out of the boils of the [sic] hell, a satanic state.

The Anti-Defamation League has called Finkelstein an "obsessive anti-Zionist" filled with "vitriolic hatred of Zionism and Israel." Of being called an anti-Zionist, Finkelstein has said: "It's a superficial term. I am opposed to any state with an ethnic character, not only to Israel."

Finkelstein believes that the main reason the conflict isn't resolved is "the refusal of Israel, backed by the United States government, to abide by international law, to abide by the opinion of the international community."

Terrorism and targeting civilians 
Finkelstein's views on terrorism and targeting civilians are ambiguous. In an interview with Emanuel Stoakes, he answered the question "Do you unequivocally condemn Palestinian attacks against innocent civilians?" as follows:

Finkelstein has said that Hamas and Hezbollah have the right to defend their countries from what he sees as Israeli aggression, and that both Israel and Hamas are guilty of targeting civilians. Israel, he claims, indiscriminately kills Palestinians, which he says is the same thing as targeting civilians. There is an equivalence between these groups and Israel, he argues: "If Hezbollah is a terrorist organization, if you want to make that claim, I won’t argue with you so long as you say further that Israel is a terrorist organization by probably, at least, 25-fold greater."

Hezbollah and Hamas

Finkelstein has expressed solidarity with Hezbollah with respect to defensive actions.

I was of course happy to meet the Hezbollah people, because it is a point of view that is rarely heard in the United States. I have no problem saying that I do want to express solidarity with them, and I am not going to be a coward of a hypocrite about it.

He has said that Hezbollah has "a serious leadership whose commitment is matched by its intelligence and its incorruptibility" and expressed admiration for its Secretary General Hassan Nasrallah. He believes that the 2006 Israel–Hezbollah War demonstrated how to defeat Israel using guerilla warfare. Hezbollah militants' superior discipline gives them an edge against Israel's army, Finkelstein argues:

Finkelstein argues that one of Israel's primary motives for the 2008 offensive in Gaza was that Hamas was "signaling that it wanted a diplomatic settlement of the conflict along the June 1967 border." He believes Hamas has joined the international community in "seeking a diplomatic settlement" and has called Hamas's stance toward Israel before the war a "peace offensive".

One-state solution, two-state solution, and the Palestinian refugees 

Finkelstein has said he believes that the Palestine solidarity movement should focus on a pragmatic settlement of the Israel-Palestinian conflict rather than a just one. In his view, the two-state solution is the pragmatic option and the one-state solution the idealistic one. He concedes that the two-state solution is deeply unjust to the Palestinians:

According to Finkelstein, the two-state solution is achievable and the one-state solution is not. His view of the one-state solution is "a society in which Jews and Palestinians enjoy the same democratic rights. One Jew, one vote, one Palestinian, one vote." This, he argues, is a society Israeli Jews will never acquiesce to because Jewish dominance cannot be guaranteed. He argues that it would be tantamount to Israel giving up "its existence, its rationale, and the security of all its Jewish citizens". He similarly argues that the Palestinian refugees who were forced to leave their homes in the 1948 war, whom Israel prevents from returning, have the right of return to what is now Israel. But he believes that insisting on that right is unrealistic and doubts international public support could be found for it:

Finkelstein further argues that even if a binational state comes into existence, there is no guarantee of an absence of bloodshed. He sees the Yugoslav Wars, Lebanon, and Czechoslovakia as showing why Jews and Palestinians sharing a state could be problematic.

For these reasons, Finkelstein prefers the two-state solution. He believes that, while such a solution is currently politically impossible, it could come to fruition through mutually agreed land swaps and by evacuating about half of all Israeli West Bank settlers:

Finkelstein argues that many Israeli Jews see the ongoing occupation and the West Bank settlements as problematic; that they benefit only a small segment of Israel's Jews; that they complicate security arrangements; that the occupation is expensive; and that it earns Israel near-universal opprobrium. Thus, he argues, Israel could be compelled to accept a two-state solution. The Palestinian right of return would not necessarily be relinquished if a two-state solution was implemented, but according to Finkelstein, the Palestinians could still impose it on Israel if they became powerful enough.

The BDS movement
Finkelstein's opinions on the one-state solution and the right of return lay the foundation for his critique of the Boycott, Divestment and Sanctions (BDS) movement. BDS demands three things of Israel: an end to the occupation and the removal of the separation barrier in the West Bank, full equality for Arab-Palestinian citizens of Israel; and "respecting, protecting, and promoting the rights of Palestinian refugees to return to their homes and properties". It advocates international boycotts, divestment and sanctions against Israel to achieve these goals. Finkelstein believes that BDS's tactics are correct but not its demands. BDS has no official position on the one- or the two-state solution, which he finds dishonest, because in his view, BDS's demands would eliminate Israel: "If we end the occupation and bring back six million Palestinians and we have equal rights for Arabs and Jews, there’s no Israel."

BDS claims that its demands are anchored in international law. Finkelstein disputes this because the international community recognizes Israel. Therefore, because he believes that BDS's demands would lead to the end of Israel, international law does not support them. He also believes that there is a "limit of the spectrum of progressive thought in the world we live" and that BDS's demands exceed that limit. Therefore, he argues, BDS is a "cult" that cannot reach the broad public: "if you want to go past that law or ignore the Israel part, you'll never reach a broad public. And then it's a cult."

BDS claims to enjoy broad support in Palestinian civil society. Finkelstein claims that is a lie:

Finkelstein believes that BDS serves the role as "a new Great Satan" to the Israeli government, an external threat "bent on Israel's destruction" to rally around. In his view, international public opinion has begun to turn against Israel but BDS allows it "to play victim." He believes that by inflating the threat of BDS, the Israeli government delegitimizes other critics of Israel:

Finkelstein contends that BDS has allowed Israel to "play the victim card" and shift the debate from pressing human rights concerns, such as the ongoing blockade of Gaza, to the question of whether BDS is anti-Semitic. He believes that BDS has helped Israel in this effort: "But it must also be said that BDS made it very easy for Israel, by refusing to recognize its legality as a state within the pre-June 1967 borders."

Finkelstein's criticism of BDS has put him on a collision course with other voices in the Palestinian solidarity movement who support it. He suspects that his public criticism has caused him to be locked out of the pro-Palestinian debating circuit:

Both Ali Abunimah and Steven Salaita have written articles criticizing Finkelstein's arguments.

Other statements

Charlie Hebdo shootings
On the shooters of the Charlie Hebdo shooting on January 7, 2015, Finkelstein commented two weeks later:
 
So two despairing and desperate young men act out their despair and desperation against this political pornography no different than Der Stürmer, who in the midst of all of this death and destruction decide it's somehow noble to degrade, demean, humiliate and insult the people. I'm sorry, maybe it is very politically incorrect. I have no sympathy for [the staff of Charlie Hebdo]. Should they have been killed? Of course not. But of course, Streicher shouldn't have been hung [sic]. I don't hear that from many people."

On Holocaust denial 
In a July 2020 online discussion with British activists, Finkelstein said David Irving "was a very good historian". Finding insufficient the evidence of Richard J. Evans as the expert witness in Irving's unsuccessful libel action in 2000 against Deborah Lipstadt, who had labeled Irving a Holocaust denier, Finkelstein said Irving had "produced works that are substantive…If you don’t like it, don’t read it. In the case of Irving, he knew a thing or two—or three". The Daily Telegraph in 2000 accused Finkelstein in The Holocaust Industry of defending Irving against Lipstadt, and, according to historian Tobias Abse, giving Irving qualified, secondhand praise.

In October 2020, Finkelstein published an extract from his forthcoming book, Cancel Culture, Academic Freedom and Me on his website following the banning of Holocaust denial from Facebook and Twitter. According to Finkelstein, "Holocaust denial should be taught in university and preferably by a Holocaust denier" as a means "to inoculate students" against it. He states: "If one is committed to the purity of truth, not just in its wholeness but also in its parts, then a Holocaust denier performs the useful function of ferreting out 'local' errors, precisely because he is a devil’s advocate—that is, fanatically committed to 'unmasking' the 'hoax of the 20th century.'"

Works
 2022: I'll Burn That Bridge When I Get To It, Sublation Media, Portland, ISBN TBC
 2019: I Accuse!: Herewith A Proof Beyond Reasonable Doubt That ICC Chief Prosecutor Fatou Bensouda Whitewashed Israel, OR Books, New York (2019), 
 2018: Gaza: An Inquest Into Its Martyrdom, University of California Press, Oakland, California, January 2018, 
 2014: Method and Madness: The Hidden Story of Israel's Assaults on Gaza, OR Books, New York (2014), 
 2014: Old Wine, Broken Bottle: Ari Shavit's Promised Land, OR Books, New York (2014), 
 2012: Knowing Too Much: Why the American Jewish Romance with Israel is Coming to an End, OR Books, New York (2012) 
 2012: What Gandhi Says About Nonviolence, Resistance and Courage, OR Books, New York: 2012, 
 2011: Goldstone Recants. Richard Goldstone renews Israel's license to kill", OR Books, New York (2011), 
 2010: This Time We Went Too Far: Truth and Consequences of the Gaza Invasion. OR Books, New York: 2010. 
 2005: Beyond Chutzpah: On the Misuse of Anti-Semitism and the Abuse of History. University of California Press: Berkeley, 2005. 
 2000: The Holocaust Industry: Reflections on the Exploitation of Jewish Suffering, Verso; .
 1998: A Nation on Trial: The Goldhagen Thesis and Historical Truth (co-written with Ruth Bettina Birn), Henry Holt and Co.; .
 1996: The Rise and Fall of Palestine: A Personal Account of the Intifada Years.  Minneapolis: U of Minnesota P, .
 1995: Image and Reality of the Israel-Palestine Conflict, Verso; 
 1987: From the Jewish Question to the Jewish State: An Essay on the Theory of Zionism (thesis), Princeton University.

See also
 American Radical: The Trials of Norman Finkelstein 2009 documentary

 References 
Notes

Bibliography
Books

 
 , contains an appendix written by Frank J. Menetrez, Dershowitz vs Finkelstein. Who's Right and Who's Wrong?, pp. 363–94.
 
 
 

Critics of Finkelstein and replies

 
 
 
 , calling Finkelstein a "Holocaust denier"

External links

Official website of Norman G. Finkelstein
"Depaul University -- Against" bibliography at "Norman G. Finkelstein Solidarity Campaign"
American Radical: The Trials of Norman Finkelstein official site of the documentary film
'An Interview with Norman Finkelstein' State of Nature interview with Norman Finkelstein (2008)

Videos

Eight Interviews with Finkelstein (two sets of four), December 2014 and January 2015, and Three More Interviews with Finkelstein, May 2015, The Real News
American Radical: The Trials of Norman Finkelstein - broadcast of the documentary in two parts
Resolving the Israel-Palestine Conflict : University of British Columbia, Vancouver, January 21, 2009.
Interview broadcast on Lebanese TV January 20, 2008
VIDEO: Norman Finkelstein - Israel and Palestine: Roots of Conflict, Prospects for Peace, presentation in Seattle, Washington, May 8, 2008.
VIDEO: Norman Finkelstein - The Coming Breakup of American Zionism, presentation in Olympia, Washington, May 8, 2008.
, April 15, 2008
Doha Debate at the Oxford Union Video of debate on whether the "pro-Israeli lobby has successfully stifled Western debate about Israel's actions" with Andrew Cockburn, Martin Indyk, and David Aaronovitch, May 1, 2007
Debate with Shlomo Ben-Ami on Democracy Now!, February 14, 2006
Finkelstein Responds to Clinton, Netanyahu AIPAC Comments March 23, 2010
 Israel vs Palestine - featuring Norman Finkelstein (April 2014), Juice Rap News

1953 births
20th-century American historians
20th-century American male writers
21st-century American historians
21st-century American male writers
American people of Polish-Jewish descent
American political scientists
American political writers
Binghamton University alumni
DePaul University faculty
Educators from New York (state)
Historians of Jews and Judaism
Historians of the Holocaust
Historians of the Middle East
Hunter College faculty
James Madison High School (Brooklyn) alumni
Jewish American historians
Jewish peace activists
Jewish socialists
Living people
New York University faculty
Norman Finkelstein
People from Borough Park, Brooklyn
Princeton University alumni
Rutgers University faculty
Brooklyn College faculty
Writers from Brooklyn
Writers on antisemitism
Writers on Zionism
American male non-fiction writers
People from Mill Basin, Brooklyn
Historians from New York (state)
Gandhians